Tetrasarus is a genus of beetles in the family Cerambycidae, containing the following species:

Species
T. albescens Bates, 1880
T. callistus Bates, 1880
T. formosus Bates, 1885
T. inops Bates, 1880
T. lezamai Chemsak & Hovore, 2002
T. lineatus Brèthes, 1920
T. nanus Chemsak & Hovore, 2002
T. pictulus Bates, 1880
T. plato Bates, 1885
T. quadriscopulatus (Thomson, 1868)
T. similis Chemsak & Hovore, 2002

References

Acanthoderini